Miesinnei Mercy Genesis (born 20 September 1997) is a Nigerian freestyle wrestler. She won the gold medal in the women's 50 kg event at the 2022 Commonwealth Games held in Birmingham, England. At the 2016 Summer Olympics in Rio de Janeiro, Brazil, she competed in the Women’s freestyle -48 kg.

In 2019, she won the silver medal in the women's 50 kg beach wrestling event at the 2019 World Beach Games held in Doha, Qatar. She was stripped of her medal in February 2021 due to anti-doping rule violations.

In 2020, she won the gold medal in the women's freestyle 50 kg event at the 2020 African Wrestling Championships.

She competed in the 50kg event at the 2022 World Wrestling Championships held in Belgrade, Serbia.

References

External links
 

Olympic wrestlers of Nigeria
1997 births
Wrestlers at the 2016 Summer Olympics
Living people
African Games gold medalists for Nigeria
African Games medalists in wrestling
Competitors at the 2015 African Games
Competitors at the 2019 African Games
Doping cases in wrestling
Nigerian sportspeople in doping cases
African Wrestling Championships medalists
Wrestlers at the 2022 Commonwealth Games
Commonwealth Games gold medallists for Nigeria
Commonwealth Games medallists in wrestling
20th-century Nigerian women
21st-century Nigerian women
Medallists at the 2022 Commonwealth Games